George Christopher Williams (May 12, 1926 – September 8, 2010) was an American evolutionary biologist.

Williams was a professor of biology at the State University of New York at Stony Brook who was best known for his vigorous critique of group selection.  The work of Williams in this area, along with W. D. Hamilton, John Maynard Smith, Richard Dawkins, and others led to the development of the gene-centered view of evolution in the 1960s.

Academic work
Williams' 1957 paper Pleiotropy, Natural Selection, and the Evolution of Senescence is one of the most influential in 20th century evolutionary biology, and contains at least 3 foundational ideas. The central hypothesis of antagonistic pleiotropy remains the prevailing evolutionary explanation of senescence. In this paper Williams was also the first to propose that senescence should be  generally synchronized by natural selection. According to this original formulation

if the adverse genic effects appeared earlier in one system than any other, they would be removed by selection from that system more readily than from any other. In other words, natural selection will always be in greatest opposition to the decline of the most senescence-prone system.

This important concept of synchrony of senescence was taken up a short time later by John Maynard Smith, and the origin of the idea is often misattributed to him, including in his obituary in the journal Nature. Finally, Williams' 1957 paper was the first to outline the "grandmother hypothesis". William's formulation stated that natural selection might select for menopause and post-reproductive life in females (though not explicitly mentioning grandchildren or the inclusive fitness contribution of grand-parenting).

In his first book, Adaptation and Natural Selection, Williams advocated a "ground rule - or perhaps doctrine would be a better term - ... that adaptation is a special and onerous concept that should only be used where it is really necessary", and, that, when it is necessary, selection among genes or individuals would in general be the preferable explanation for it. He elaborated this view in later books and papers, which contributed to the development of a gene-centered view of evolution; Richard Dawkins built on Williams' ideas in this area in the book The Selfish Gene.

Williams was also well known for his work on the evolution of sex, and was an advocate of evolutionary medicine.

In later books, including Natural Selection: Domains, Levels and Challenges, Williams softened his views on group selection, recognizing that clade selection, trait group selection and multilevel selection did sometimes occur in nature, something he had earlier thought to be so unlikely it could be safely ignored.

Williams became convinced that the genic neo-Darwinism of his earlier years, while essentially correct as a theory of microevolutionary change, could not account for evolutionary phenomena over longer time scales, and was thus an "utterly inadequate account of the evolution of the Earth's biota" (1992, p. 31). In particular, he became a staunch advocate of clade selection – a generalisation of species selection to monophyletic clades of any rank – which could potentially explain phenomena such as adaptive radiations, long-term phylogenetic trends, and biases in rates of speciation/extinction. In Natural Selection (1992), Williams argued that these phenomena cannot be explained by selectively-driven allele substitutions within populations, the evolutionary mechanism he had originally championed over all others. This book thus represents a substantial departure from the position of Adaptation and Natural Selection.

Academic career
Williams received a Ph.D. in biology from the University of California at Los Angeles in 1955. At Stony Brook he taught courses in marine vertebrate zoology, and he often used ichthyological examples in his books.

In 1992, Williams was awarded the Daniel Giraud Elliot Medal from the National Academy of Sciences. He won the Crafoord Prize for Bioscience jointly with Ernst Mayr and John Maynard Smith in 1999. Richard Dawkins describes Williams as "one of the most respected of American evolutionary biologists".

Books
 Williams, G.C. 1966. Adaptation and Natural Selection. Princeton University Press, Princeton, N.J.
 Williams, G.C., ed. 1971. Group Selection. Aldine-Atherton, Chicago.
 Williams, G.C. 1975. Sex and Evolution. Princeton University Press, Princeton, N.J.
 Paradis, J. and G.C. Williams. 1989. T.H. Huxley's Evolution and Ethics : with New Essays on its Victorian and Sociobiological Context. Princeton University Press, Princeton, N.J.
 Williams, G.C. 1992. Natural Selection: Domains, Levels, and Challenges. Oxford University Press, New York.
 Nesse, R.M. and G.C. Williams. 1994. Why We Get Sick : the New Science of Darwinian Medicine. Times Books, New York.
 Williams, G.C. 1996. Plan and Purpose in Nature. Weidenfeld & Nicolson, London (published in the U.S. in 1997 as The Pony Fish's Glow : and Other Clues to Plan and Purpose in Nature. Basic Books, New York).

Selected papers

Controversy
Williams supervised an undergraduate project in 1985 which consisted of a student, Mitchell Behm, tossing live animals into tubs with domesticated ferrets, which Behm subsequently admitted he partly did "for his own amusement." Dr. Charles Middleton, Director of the Division of Laboratory Animal Resources stated, "If animals are just going to tear each other up, the experiment would not have been approved." Ferrets were illegal in New York at the time, without a license, which neither individual had.

After police investigation, Williams received a formal reprimand from SUNY Stony Brook for never receiving approval because of not detailing the pain of the animals involved, and for allowing non-campus animals to participate. Because the statute of limitations had expired, Williams narrowly escaped strict disciplinary action, in addition to criminal prosecution. Dr. Mark Lerman, Medical Director of Lifeline for Wildlife said there was no justification and that the experiment was completely useless.

The experiments were in direct violation of the Animal Welfare Act of 1966 and its PHS policy amendment introducing the Institutional Animal Care and Use Committee model, to which SUNY and all of its researchers were subject in 1988.

References

External links
Official website 
 Article from Science by Carl Zimmer
 A Conversation With George C. Williams by Frans Roes 
Obituary by Richard Dawkins, October 1, 2010 
Stephen C. Stearns, "George Christopher Williams", Biographical Memoirs of the National Academy of Sciences (2011)

1926 births
2010 deaths
Evolutionary biologists
Members of the United States National Academy of Sciences
Stony Brook University faculty
University of California, Los Angeles alumni
Critics of creationism
Neurological disease deaths in New York (state)
Deaths from Parkinson's disease
Biogerontologists
20th-century American biologists
Modern synthesis (20th century)
21st-century American biologists
People from Charlotte, North Carolina
Scientists from North Carolina